Metanephrops australiensis, commonly known as Australian scampi or the northwest lobster, is a species of lobster. It is found off the north-west coast of Western Australia, ranging from the city of Eucla to Indonesia. It is prolific near Port Hedland.

References

True lobsters
Crustaceans of Australia
Crustaceans described in 1966